The 1924 Winter Olympics, officially known as the I Olympic Winter Games and commonly known as Chamonix 1924, were a winter multi-sport event which was held in 1924 in Chamonix, France. Originally held in association with the 1924 Summer Olympics, the sports competitions were held at the foot of Mont Blanc in Chamonix, and Haute-Savoie, France between 25 January and 5 February 1924.  The Games were organized by the French Olympic Committee, and were originally reckoned as the "International Winter Sports Week." With the success of the event, it was retroactively designated by the International Olympic Committee (IOC) as "the first Olympic Winter Games".

The tradition of holding the Winter Olympics in the same year as the Summer Olympics would continue until 1992, after which the current practice of holding a Winter Olympics in the second year after each Summer Olympics began.

Although Figure Skating had been an Olympic event in both London and Antwerp, and Ice Hockey had been an event in Antwerp, the winter sports had always been limited by the season. In 1921, at the convention of the IOC in Lausanne, there was a call for equality for winter sports, and after much discussion it was decided to organize an "international week of winter sport" in 1924 in Chamonix.

Highlights

Day 2 
The first gold medal to be awarded at the Olympic Winter Games was won by Charles Jewtraw of the United States in the 500-meter speed skate, making him the first Winter Olympic champion.

Day 4 
Sonja Henie of Norway, at just eleven years old, took part in the ladies' figure skating competition. Although she finished last, she became popular with fans and went on to take gold at the next three Winter Olympics.

Day 6 
Figure skater Gillis Grafström of Sweden became the first athlete to successfully defend his Summer Olympic title at the Winter Olympics (having won a gold medal in 1920).

Day 8 
The Canadian ice hockey team (Toronto Granites) finished their qualifying round with three wins, against Czechoslovakia (30–0), Sweden (22–0), and Switzerland (33–0), scoring a total of 85 goals and conceding none.

Day 10 
Finding themselves in the same situation as Gillis Grafström, the Canadian ice-hockey team is the last to successfully defend its Summer Olympics title at the Winter Olympics. Canada would dominate ice hockey in early Olympic competition, winning six of the first seven gold medals awarded.

Epilogue 
At the closing ceremony, a prize for a sport not part of the Olympic Winter Games was awarded for alpinism by Pierre de Coubertin to Lt Col Edward Strutt, the deputy leader of and on behalf of the British expedition which had attempted to climb Mount Everest in 1922.

For the first time in the history of the modern Olympics, the host country (in this case, France) failed to win any gold medals, finishing with three bronze medals. The same outcome occurred at the next Winter Olympics in St. Moritz where Switzerland won only a single bronze medal, the lowest ever output by a host nation at an Olympics. Later host nations to finish without gold medals included Canada at the 1976 Summer Olympics in Montreal, Yugoslavia at the 1984 Winter Olympics in Sarajevo, and Canada for a second time at the 1988 Winter Olympics in Calgary.

In 1925, the International Olympic Committee (IOC) decided to organize Olympic Winter Games every four years, independent of the Olympic Games proper, and recognized the International Winter Sports Week as the first Olympic Winter Games in retrospect.

The final individual medal of Chamonix 1924 was presented in 1974. The ski jumping event was unusual in that the bronze medalist was not determined for fifty years. Norway's Thorleif Haug was awarded third place at the event's conclusion, but a clerical error in calculating Haug's score was discovered in 1974 by skiing historian Jakob Vaage, who further determined that Anders Haugen of the United States, who had finished fourth, had actually scored 0.095 points more than Haug. This was verified by the IOC, and in Oslo in September 1974, Haug's daughter presented the medal to the 86-year-old Haugen.

In 2006, the IOC confirmed that the medals awarded to the 1924 curling teams were official. The IOC verified that curling was officially part of the program, after the Glasgow Herald newspaper filed a claim on behalf of the families of the team.

Events 
Medals were awarded in 16 events contested in 5 sports (9 disciplines). Many sources do not list curling and the military patrol, or list them as demonstration events. However, no such designation was made in 1924. In February 2006, the International Olympic Committee (IOC) ruled that curling was a full part of the Olympic program, and have included the medals awarded in the official count.

 
 
 
 Skating

Venues

 La Piste de Bobsleigh des Pellerins – Bobsleigh
 Le Tremplin Olympique du Mont – Ski jumping, Nordic combined (ski jumping)
 Stade Olympique de Chamonix – Cross-country skiing, Curling, Figure skating, Ice hockey, Military patrol, Nordic combined (cross-country skiing), and Speed skating

Participating nations 
Athletes from 16 nations competed in the first Winter Olympic Games. Germany was banned from competing in the games, and instead hosted a series of games called Deutsche Kampfspiele.

  speed skater Christfried Burmeister was also in the list of participants but the message about his withdrawal wasn't sent to the organizers.

Number of athletes by National Olympic Committees

<noinclude>

Medal count

Podium sweeps

See also
 List of 1924 Winter Olympics medal winners

Notes

References

External links 

 
 Official Report (1924) of both Summer and Winter games: 

 
1924
1924
1924 in multi-sport events
1924 in French sport
January 1924 sports events
February 1924 sports events
Olympics 1924